Robert Linn (August 11, 1925 – October 28, 1999) was an American composer and an educator at the University of Southern California. His notable students there included Morten Lauridsen, Billy Childs, Donald Crockett, and David Froom.

His works include music for symphony orchestra, wind orchestra, chorus and chamber ensembles.

Sources
Myrna Oliver, Robert Linn; Composer, USC Music School Teacher. Obituary, Los Angeles Times, November 2, 1999

External links
 Web site dedicated to the life and memory of Robert Linn, with downloadable audio files available
 Interview with Robert Linn, June 24, 1993

1925 births
1999 deaths
American male composers
Pupils of Darius Milhaud
20th-century American composers
20th-century American male musicians